Antai may refer to:

Antai Subdistrict, Fuzhou, Fujian, China
Antai Subdistrict, Qing'an County, Heilongjiang, China
Antai Village, Marakei, Kiribati
Antai-ji or Antai Temple, Buddhist temple in Shin'onsen, Mikata District, Hyōgo, Japan
Antai College of Economics and Management, business school of Shanghai Jiao Tong University, China

See also

Antani